Pain Ahmad Chaleh Pey (also Romanized as Pā’īn Aḩmad Chāleh Pey; also known as Anjelibei, Pā’īn Aḩmad, Pā’īn Aḩmad Chāl Pey, and Pā’īn Chāl) is a village in Lalehabad Rural District, Lalehabad District, Babol County, Mazandaran Province, Iran. At the 2006 census, its population was 1,684, in 445 families.

References 

Populated places in Babol County